Vice admiral is a senior naval flag officer rank, usually equivalent to lieutenant general and air marshal. A vice admiral is typically senior to a rear admiral and junior to an admiral.

Australia

In the Royal Australian Navy, the rank of vice admiral is held by the Chief of Navy and, when the positions are held by navy officers, by the Vice Chief of the Defence Force, the Chief of Joint Operations, and/or the Chief of Capability Development Group.

Vice admiral is the equivalent of air marshal in the Royal Australian Air Force and lieutenant general in the Australian Army.

Bangladesh
Vice admiral is a three-star admiral rank of the Bangladesh Navy.

Canada

In the Royal Canadian Navy, the rank of vice-admiral (VAdm) (vice-amiral or Vam in French) is equivalent to lieutenant-general of the Canadian Army and Royal Canadian Air Force. A vice-admiral is a flag officer, the naval equivalent of a general officer. A vice-admiral is senior to a rear-admiral and major general, and junior to an admiral and general.

The rank insignia of a Canadian vice-admiral is as follows: 
 
 On the navy blue mess dress jacket and the navy blue service dress tunic: the cuff insignia is one wide gold braid below two standard size gold braids, the superior one includes the executive curl.
 On tropical white mess dress and tropical white service dress tunic: three silver maple leaves, beneath silver crossed sword and baton, all surmounted by a St. Edward's Crown located on gold shoulder boards.

Two rows of gold oak leaves are located on the black visor of the white service cap.  From 1968 to June 2010, the navy blue service dress tunic featured only a wide gold braid around the cuff with three gold maple leaves, beneath crossed sword and baton, all surmounted by a St. Edward's Crown located on cloth shoulder straps.

Vice-admirals are addressed by rank and name; thereafter by subordinates as "Sir" or "Ma'am".  Vice-admirals are normally entitled to a staff car; the car will normally bear a flag, dark blue with three gold maple leaves arranged one over two.

A vice-admiral generally holds only the most senior command or administrative appointments, barring only Chief of Defence Staff, which is held by a full admiral or general. Appointments held by vice-admirals may include:
 Vice Chief of the Defence Staff (VCDS);
 Deputy Chief of Defence Staff (DCDS);
 Commander of an operational command (such as Canadian Joint Operations Command);
 Commander of the Royal Canadian Navy;
 Assistant Deputy Minister (ADM) of Defence in various capacities;
 Commander of, or representative to, a multinational force, alliance, or treaty organization.

Charles III holds the honorary rank of vice admiral in the Royal Canadian Navy.

France 

In France, vice-amiral is the most senior of the ranks in the French Navy; higher ranks, vice-amiral d'escadre and amiral, are permanent functions, styles and positions (in French rangs et appellations) given to a vice-amiral-ranking officer. The vice-amiral rank used to be an OF-8 rank in NATO charts, but nowadays, it is more an OF-7 rank.

The rank of vice-amiral d'escadre (literally, "squadron vice-admiral", with more precision, "fleet vice-admiral") equals a NATO OF-8 rank.

In the ancien régime Navy, between 1669 and 1791. The office of "Vice-Admiral of France" (Vice-amiral de France) was the highest rank, the supreme office of "Admiral of France" being purely ceremonial.

Distinct offices were :
 1669–1791 Vice-admiral of the West (Atlantic Ocean).
 1669–1791 Vice-admiral of the East (Mediterranean Sea).
 1778–1791 Vice-admiral of the Asian and American Seas (American shores).
 1784–1788 Vice-admiral of the Indian Seas (Indian Ocean).

Germany

 Vizeadmiral is an OF-8 three-star rank equivalent to the German Heer and Luftwaffe rank of Generalleutnant.

India 

In India, vice admiral is a three-star admiral rank of the Indian Navy.

Italy
In Italy, the equivalent to vice admiral is the ammiraglio di squadra or squadron admiral.

Philippines
In the Philippines, the rank vice admiral is the highest-ranking official of the Philippine Navy. He is recognized as the flag officer in-command of the navy, an equivalent post to the Chief of Naval Operations in the U.S. Navy.

Poland
Before World War II, the vice admiral was the highest rank in the Polish Navy. Jozef Unrug was one of the only two officers to achieve the rank. The other was Jerzy Świrski. Poland had only one sovereign sea port, Port of Gdynia, and was slowly building a small modern navy that was to be ready by 1950. The navy was not a priority for obvious reasons. At present, it is a "two-star" rank. The stars are not used; however, the stars were used in between 1952 and 1956 and are still used in the vice admiral's pennant.

Sri Lanka

Vice admiral is a three-star rank in the Sri Lanka Navy, and is held by the Commander of the Sri Lanka Navy.

Sweden

In Sweden, vice admiral is a three-star admiral rank of the Swedish Navy.

United Kingdom

In the Royal Navy the rank of vice-admiral should be distinguished from the office of "Vice-Admiral of the United Kingdom", which is an Admiralty position usually held by a retired "full" admiral, and that of "Vice-Admiral of the Coast", a now obsolete office dealing with naval administration in each of the maritime counties.

United States

In the United States, the rank of vice admiral exists in the United States Navy, United States Coast Guard, United States Public Health Service Commissioned Corps, and National Oceanic and Atmospheric Administration Commissioned Officer Corps.

NATO code
While the rank of vice admiral is used in most of NATO countries, it is ranked differently depending on the country.

Gallery

References

See also
 Comparative military ranks

Military ranks of Canada
Military insignia
Naval ranks
Military ranks of Australia
Military ranks of Singapore